The 2017 UMass Minutemen football team represented the University of Massachusetts Amherst in the 2017 NCAA Division I FBS football season. This was the fourth year of head coach Mark Whipple's second stint at UMass and 10th year overall. The Minutemen divided their home schedule between two stadiums. Five home games were played at the UMass campus at Warren McGuirk Alumni Stadium with their final home game at Fenway Park. This was UMass's second year as an independent. They finished the season 4–8.

Schedule

The game between UMass and South Florida was postponed due to Hurricane Irma. A game with FIU was scheduled after FIU's game with Indiana was cancelled.
Schedule Source:

☆All Eleven Sports broadcasts will be simulcast on NESN or NESN+.

Game summaries

Hawaii

Sources:

Coastal Carolina
Sources:

Old Dominion
Sources:

Temple
Sources:

Tennessee
Sources:

Ohio
Sources:

Georgia Southern
Sources:

Appalachian State
Sources:

Mississippi State
Sources:

Maine
Sources:

BYU
Sources:

FIU
Sources:

References

UMass
UMass Minutemen football seasons
UMass Minutemen football